CWE may refer to:

Sports
Canberra White Eagles, a Serbian Australian supported football (soccer) club from Canberra, ACT, Australia.
Canadian Wrestling Elite, an independent wrestling promotion in Canada
 Continental Wrestling Entertainment, an Indian wrestling promotion led by The Great Khali

Other uses
Camp War Eagle, the name of the United States Army camp located at the Northeast corner of the Baghdad slum known as Sadr City
Cartier Wind Energy, a developer, owner and operator of wind farms in Quebec, Canada
Central West End, St. Louis, Missouri, United States
China International Water & Electric Corporation, a Chinese construction and engineering company
Chinese Wand Exercise, an obscure ancient exercise system, related to the martial art Kung Fu
Cold water extraction, the process whereby a substance is extracted from a mixture via cold water
Collaborative working environment, supports people in their individual and cooperative work
Common Weakness Enumeration, a software community project to create a catalog of software vulnerabilities
Cross Westchester Expressway, a freeway north of New York City
Crowle railway station station code